Michelle Ayele Ackerley (born 21 July 1984) is an English television presenter and journalist, best known for her work on BBC programmes such as Watchdog and The One Show.

Early life
Ackerley grew up in Manchester. Her maternal grandfather was a chief of the Ga people in Ghana. Ackerley was educated at Alderley Edge School for Girls where she was Deputy Head Girl during her final year. She graduated from the University of Manchester with a degree in psychology.

Career
Ackerly gained radio experience at All FM 96.9 radio in Manchester and joined the BBC in 2005 as a programme maker. She has co-presented the CBBC series All Over the Place since 2013. In 2013, she occasionally presented "The Hub" section on This Morning.

In 2015 and 2016, she co-presented the BBC One consumer affairs programme Watchdog. She co-presented the second series of Watchdog Test House.

She has been a reporter for the BBC's Crimewatch Roadshow since 2015.

Ackerley presented the second, third and fourth series of Council House Crackdown from 2016 to 2018. She has presented reports for the BBC's Inside Out. She was a contestant in an episode of Celebrity Mastermind in December 2016.

Since 2016, Ackerley has guest presented episodes of the nightly magazine show The One Show.

Ackerley has also co-hosted Totally Rubbish, I Want My Own Room and Deadly Art for CBBC. She also stars in the CBBC art series, Art Ninja. In January 2018, she participated in an episode of And They're Off! in aid of Sport Relief. Also in 2018, she appeared in Celebrity Masterchef. Since 2018 she has presented Fantasy Homes by the Sea. In August 2020, she featured as a lead presenter on ITV's Loose Women for two episodes.

Filmography
Television

References

External links
 

1984 births
Living people
BBC television presenters
English television presenters
Black British television personalities
English people of Ghanaian descent
Alumni of the University of Manchester
Mass media people from Manchester